Gattu Bheemudu was an Indian politician belonging to Telangana Rashtra Samithi. He was elected as a member of the Andhra Pradesh Legislative Assembly from Gadwal in 1999. He died on 12 June 2019 at the age of 67.

References

2019 deaths
Telangana Rashtra Samithi politicians
Members of the Andhra Pradesh Legislative Assembly
1950s births